Brandon Bye (born November 29, 1995) is an American professional soccer player who plays for Major League Soccer club New England Revolution.

Career

College and amateur
Bye was born in Kalamazoo, Michigan and grew up in nearby Portage, Michigan. He played his college career at Western Michigan University where he played mainly as a winger. Bye played 64 matches for the Broncos, starting 62. He scored 22 goals and had 19 assists.

Bye also played for National Premier Soccer League sides Grand Rapids FC, Kalamazoo FC and Minneapolis City SC.

Professional
On January 19, 2018, New England Revolution selected Bye with the 8th overall pick of the 2018 MLS SuperDraft. He signed with the club on February 10, 2018.

Bye made his professional debut on March 3, 2018 as a 55th-minute substitute during a 0–2 loss to Philadelphia Union.

Career statistics

Club

Honors
New England Revolution
Supporters' Shield: 2021

References

External links
 

Living people
1995 births
American soccer players
Association football midfielders
African-American soccer players
Western Michigan Broncos men's soccer players
New England Revolution players
New England Revolution draft picks
Soccer players from Michigan
Major League Soccer players
All-American men's college soccer players
21st-century African-American sportspeople